Charles Hart may refer to:

Diplomats
 Charles C. Hart, United States Ambassador to Albania (1925-1929), and United States Ambassador to Iran (1930-1933)
 Charles Burdett Hart, United States Ambassador to Colombia, 1897–1903

Sportspeople
 Joe Hart, English footballer
 Charles J. Hart, American football coach

Musicians
 Charles Hart (vaudeville), early 20th-century vaudeville musician (see J. Rosamond Johnson)
 Charles Hart (lyricist) (born 1961), British lyricist, songwriter, and musician

Others
 Charles Hart (17th-century actor) (1625–1683), British actor
 Charles E. Hart (1900–1991), American general
 Charles H. Hart (1866–1934), American leader in The Church of Jesus Christ of Latter-day Saints
 Charles Henry Hart (1847–1918), American author
 Charles H. T. Hart, (fl. 1880s), founding director of South Australian Brewing Company
 Charles Walter Hart (1872–1937), tractor manufacturer
 , Pennsylvania physician and philanthropist